Hampstead and Kilburn is a constituency created in 2010 and currently represented in the House of Commons by Tulip Siddiq of the Labour Party. Glenda Jackson was the MP from 2010 to 2015, having served for the predecessor seat since 1992.

Constituency profile
The seat covers Hampstead and West Hampstead, which are known for their large houses and affluent population, and to the west, the more working-class areas of Kilburn and Queen's Park.

History
The constituency was created for the 2010 general election in which it was won by Labour's Glenda Jackson with a majority of 42 votes being the most marginal result in England; one smaller majority nationally was achieved, in Fermanagh and South Tyrone, Northern Ireland. Hampstead and Kilburn was in 2010 the closest three-way marginal seat as the third-placed candidate obtained 841 fewer votes than the winner, approximately 1% of the electorate. In January 2013, Jackson announced that she would not seek re-election, one of 37 of her party's MPs who did so in the 2015 general election.

The seat was won by Labour candidate Tulip Siddiq. The 2015 result made the seat the 10th narrowest result of the party's 232 seats (by majority percentage). Comparing the 2015 election to the 2010 election, the Liberal Democrat share of the vote fell by 25.6%, which compared to a national negative swing for the party of 15.2%.

In the 2016 referendum, in which the UK voted to leave the European Union, the constituency voted to remain by 76.6%.

In 2017, Labour significantly increased its majority to 26.6%, winning nearly 60% of votes cast.

Boundaries

The constituency covers a north-western portion of the London Borough of Camden and an easternmost portion of London Borough of Brent and has electoral wards:
 Belsize, Fortune Green, Frognal and Fitzjohns, Hampstead Town, Kilburn (Camden), Swiss Cottage, West Hampstead in the London Borough of Camden
 Brondesbury Park, Kilburn (Brent), Queens Park in the London Borough of Brent

Boundary review
Due to the Boundary Commission's Fifth Periodic Review of Westminster constituencies, the number of constituencies across the two boroughs fell from five to four. The seat of Hampstead and Kilburn is a new creation resulting from these changes.
Former wards
Hampstead Town, Belsize, Swiss Cottage, Frognal and Fitzjohns, Fortune Green, West Hampstead, and Kilburn (Camden) were transferred from the former constituency of Hampstead and Highgate. Brondesbury Park, Kilburn (Brent) and part of Queens Park wards were transferred from the former constituency of Brent East. A small part of Queens Park ward was transferred from the former constituency of Brent South.

Members of Parliament

Election results

Elections in the 2010s

* Independent candidate The Eurovisionary Carroll died following the close of nominations for the 2015 general election. Under current rules, the election proceeded with his name on the ballot paper and would have been rerun had he won.

* Served as MP for Hampstead and Highgate 1992–2010

See also
 List of parliamentary constituencies in London
 Opinion polling in United Kingdom constituencies, 2010–15 – Hampstead and Kilburn

Notes

References

External links 
Politics Resources (Election results from 1922 onwards)
Electoral Calculus (Election results from 1955 onwards)
 Hampstead and Kilburn Labour Party
 Hampstead and Kilburn Conservatives
 Hampstead and Kilburn Lib Dems

Hampstead
Parliamentary constituencies in London
Hampstead and Kilburn
Politics of the London Borough of Camden